D. Paio Peres Correia was a Portuguese warrior who played an important role in the thirteenth-century Reconquista. He was born c. 1205, in Monte de Fralães, a civil parish in the municipality of Barcelos.

He went to Uclés, then the seat of the Order of Santiago, very young. His career path took him back to Portugal, where he became comendador of Alcácer, i.e. the leader of the Portuguese knight-friars of Santiago, in 1232. In close collaboration with Sancho II of Portugal, the knight-friars conducted several campaigns against the Moors in the region of Alentejo. These events are ill-documented, but it seems that the initial focus was on the castle of Aljustrel, which fell before March 1235. Form there he fortified a hill in Padrões and manned it with 40 knights which ravaged the defences of Mértola, a stronghold of real strategic importance as it gave access to the mouth of the Guadiana. Eventually, Mértola fell to the knights-friar which were under the command of his cousin Martim Eanes do Vinhal. He then went southwards to the Algarve conquering Cacela and Tavira.

In 1242, in Mérida he became Grand-Master of the military Order of Santiago until the rest of his life. As such, he became an asset in the reconquering efforts of Ferdinand III of Castile. He guided his son, the prince of Castile, the future Alfonso X, in the conquest of Murcia.

According to the Crónica da Conquista do Algarve, during the reign of Afonso III of Portugal, he is said to have returned to Algarve, where he took part in the capture of Faro in 1249, thus completing the Portuguese conquest of the last part of the Algarve still in Moorish hands.

D. Paio Peres Correia is remembered in the place names and street names in many cities and towns in Portugal as Lisbon, Setúbal, Silves, and Tavira, and in Spain as Seville (Triana quarter).

In Portugal, the parish of Aldeia de Paio Pires, in Seixal, and the town of Samora Correia in Benavente claim to be named after him, although there is no evidence for this.

References 

Portuguese knights
People of the Reconquista
Grand Masters of the Order of Santiago
Portuguese Roman Catholics
1205 births
1275 deaths
People from Barcelos, Portugal
13th-century Portuguese people
Correia